Aao Kahani Buntay Hain is a Pakistani television series directed by Kanwal Khoosat and produced by Irfan Khoosat. It stars Nauman Ijaz and Sania Saeed in lead roles in the characters of a writer husband and a historian wife respectively, who play roles in their own conceived stories.

At 12th Lux Style Awards, it won Best TV Actor-Terrestrial to Ijaz, out of four nominations.

Plot summary 

The series revolves around a married couple who has artistic nature. The historian wife and the writer husband, has a warm relationship and share a close bond with each other. At every night, they conceived their stories and themselves play the roles of the characters of these stories.

Cast 

 Nauman Ijaz
 Sania Saeed
 Uzma Hassan

Production 
In an live discussion, producer Khoosat revealed that he had a great difficulty in selling the series, as many networks rejected it due to being a creative and non-usual content.

Awards and nominations

References

External links 

Urdu-language television shows